Juan Garrido (c. 1480 – c. 1550) was an Afro-Spanish conquistador known as the first documented Black person in what would become the United States. Born in West Africa, he went to Portugal as a young man. In converting to Catholicism, he chose the Spanish name Juan Garrido ("Handsome John").

Juan Garrido joined a Spanish expedition and arrived in Santo Domingo (Hispaniola) about 1502. He participated in the invasion of present-day Puerto Rico and Cuba in 1508. In 1513, as part of Juan Ponce de Leon entourage in search of gold, the expedition landed in Florida. He is the first known African to arrive in North America. By 1519, he had joined Cortes' forces and invaded present-day Mexico, participating in the siege of Tenochtitlan. He married and settled in Mexico City, where he was the first known farmer to have sowed wheat in America. He continued to serve with Spanish forces for more than 30 years, including expeditions to western Mexico and to the Pacific.

Biography 
Garrido was born in West Africa in about 1480, and came to Portugal as a youth. When baptized, he took the name Juan Garrido (Handsome John). He went to Seville, where he joined an expedition to the New World, possibly traveling in assistance to Pedro Garrido's (Handsome Peter).

Arriving in Santo Domingo in 1502 or 1503, Garrido was among the earliest Africans to reach the Americas. He was one of numerous Africans or possibly a "freedman" who had joined expeditions from Seville to the Americas. From the beginning of Spanish presence in the Americas, Africans participated as voluntary expeditionaries, conquistadors, and auxiliaries.

By 1519 Garrido participated in the expedition led by Hernán Cortés to Mexico, where they lay siege to Tenochtitlan.In 1520 he built a chapel to commemorate the many Spanish killed in battle that year by the Aztecs. It now stands as the Church of San Hipólito.

Garrido married and settled in Mexico City, where he and his wife had three children. Restall (2000) credits him with the first harvesting of wheat planted in New Spain.

Garrido and other blacks were also part of expeditions to Michoacán in the 1520s. Nuño de Guzmán swept through that region in 1529–30 with the aid of black auxiliaries.

In 1538, Garrido provided testimony on his 30 years of service as a conquistador:

See also 

Afro-Puerto Ricans

References

Further reading 
 Anthony Appiah, Kwame Anthony Appiah, Henry Louis Gates, Jr., Africana: The Encyclopedia of the African and African American Experience,
 Peter Gerhard, "A Black Conquistador in Mexico," Hispanic American Historical Review 58:3 (1978)
 James Krippner-Martinez, Rereading the Conquest: Power, Politics and the History of Early Colonial Mihoacán, Mexico, 1521–1565, Pennsylvania University Press, 2001
 Matthew Restall, "Black Conquistadors: Armed Africans in Early Spanish America," The Americas 57:2 (October 2000)

External links 
 Review: Matthew Restall, Probanza of Juan Garrido in "Black Conquistadors: Armed Africans in Early Spanish America", The Americas, Volume 57, Number 2, October 2000, pp. 171–205 | 10.1353/tam.2000.0015

African conquistadors
Spanish conquistadors
16th-century Spanish people
History of the Aztecs
Explorers of Mexico